Paul Just (born February 29, 1964) is a retired pole vaulter from Canada, who was born in Germany. He represented Canada in the men's pole vault event at the 1988 Summer Olympics, finishing in 17th place (5.30 m). Just is a resident of Toronto, Ontario.

References
 Canadian Olympic Committee

1964 births
Living people
Canadian male pole vaulters
Athletes (track and field) at the 1988 Summer Olympics
Athletes (track and field) at the 1990 Commonwealth Games
Commonwealth Games competitors for Canada
German emigrants to Canada
Olympic track and field athletes of Canada
Athletes from Toronto